The Dirt Drifters was an American country music group made up of five musicians: lead singer/guitarist Matt Fleener, vocalist/guitarist Ryan Fleener, vocalist/guitarist Jeff Middleton, bassist Jeremy Little and drummer Nick Diamond. They were signed to Warner Bros. Records and their debut CD, This Is My Blood, was released on July 19, 2011.

Their debut single, "Something Better," was released in February 2011.

Discography

Albums

Singles

Music videos

References

External links 
 The Dirt Drifters Official Website

Country music groups from Tennessee
Musical groups from Nashville, Tennessee
Warner Records artists